Robert T. Regola is an American Republican politician, and former member of the Pennsylvania State Senate. Regola represented the 39th District from 2005 to 2009. He previously served as chairman of the Board of Supervisors for Hempfield Township, Pennsylvania.  Prior to elected office, he worked as a professional surveyor.

Political career

2004 election
Regola's successful 2004 campaign against incumbent State Senator Allen Kukovich was considered one of the closest and nastiest in the state. Kukovich's campaign was sued by the Pittsburgh Tribune Review for allegedly misusing the paper's name in campaign advertisements. The suit was dismissed on Election Day by Westmoreland County Judge William J. Ober. Regola's campaign claimed that Kukovich had campaigned in gay bars in Philadelphia with then-Governor Ed Rendell in 2003, a charge denied by Kukovich and his supporters.

2008 election
Regola removed himself from consideration for re-election on August 11, 2008, citing what he characterized as "unfair" media coverage of his acquittal on perjury and gun charges related to the suicide of a teenage neighbor.  The Republican Party of Westmoreland County chose Westmoreland County Commissioner Kim Ward as the candidate, who then defeated Democratic candidate Tony Bompiani in the General Election.

References

External links
State Senator Bob Regola official PA Senate website (archived)
State Senator Bob Regola official Party website (archived)
Biography, voting record, and interest group ratings at Project Vote Smart

Republican Party Pennsylvania state senators
Living people
Year of birth missing (living people)